was one of the administrative divisions of Taiwan during the Japanese rule. The prefecture consisted of modern-day Taitung County.

Population

Administrative divisions

Cities and Districts
In 1945 (Shōwa 20), there were 3 districts.

Towns and Villages
The districts are divided into towns (街) and villages (庄)

See also
Political divisions of Taiwan (1895-1945)
Governor-General of Taiwan
Taiwan under Japanese rule
Administrative divisions of the Republic of China

Former prefectures of Japan in Taiwan